"It's Gonna Be Fine" is a song written by Barry Mann and Cynthia Weil and performed by Glenn Yarbrough.  It reached #9 on the U.S. adult contemporary chart an #54 on the Billboard Hot 100 in 1965.  It was featured on his 1965 album, It's Gonna Be Fine.

The song was produced by Al Schmitt and Neely Plumb and arranged by David Gates.

This same song was also covered by The New Christy Minstrels from their 1965 album Chim Chim Cheree.

References

1965 songs
1965 singles
Songs written by Barry Mann
Songs with lyrics by Cynthia Weil
Song recordings produced by Al Schmitt
RCA Victor singles